Darvian may refer to:
 Darvian-e Olya
 Darvian-e Sofla